Kent Gudmundsen (born 5 March 1978) is a Norwegian politician for the Conservative Party. He was elected to the Parliament of Norway from Troms in 2013 where he is member of the Standing Committee on Education, Research and Church Affairs.

References 

Conservative Party (Norway) politicians
Members of the Storting
Troms politicians
1978 births
Living people
21st-century Norwegian politicians